Béla Weiner (4 September 1896 – August 1979) was a Hungarian ice hockey player. He played for the Hungarian national team at the 1928 Winter Olympics and several World Championships.

References

External links

1896 births
1979 deaths
Hungarian ice hockey left wingers
Ice hockey players at the 1928 Winter Olympics
Olympic ice hockey players of Hungary